K211 or K-211 may refer to:

K-211 (Kansas highway), a state highway in Kansas
Russian submarine Petropavlovsk-Kamchatskiy (K-211), a Russian submarine
Violin Concerto No. 2 (Mozart) in D major, K.211